Vasyl Ruslanovych Kravets (born 20 August 1997) is a Ukrainian professional footballer who plays as a left-back for FC Vorskla Poltava.

Club career
Born in Lviv, Kravets is a product of the FC Karpaty Lviv School System. His first trainer was Vasyl Leskiv. He made his debut for FC Karpaty entering as a second-half substitute against FC Chornomorets Odesa on 10 May 2015 in Ukrainian Premier League.

On 24 January 2017, Kravets was loaned to Spanish Segunda División side CD Lugo until the end of the season, with a buyout clause. 12 June, Lugo announced that buyout option was activated.

On 13 January 2019, Kravets agreed to a four-and-a-half-year contract with La Liga side CD Leganés. He made his debut in the competition on 24 February, starting in a 1–1 home draw against Valencia CF.

On 15 January 2020, after appearing in only one cup match for Lega during the campaign, Kravets was loaned to his former side Lugo until June.

On 11 September 2020, Kravets moved to Lech Poznań on a season long loan. The following 13 July, he moved to Sporting de Gijón also in a temporary deal.

On 1 September 2022, Kravets was transferred to FC Vorskla Poltava in his home country.

International career
Kravets also plays for Ukrainian under-18 national football team and was called up for other age level representations.

Career statistics

Club

References

External links
 

1997 births
Living people
Sportspeople from Lviv
Ukrainian footballers
Association football defenders
FC Karpaty Lviv players
FC Vorskla Poltava players
CD Lugo players
CD Leganés players
Lech Poznań players
Lech Poznań II players
Sporting de Gijón players
Ukrainian Premier League players
La Liga players
Segunda División players
Ekstraklasa players
II liga players
Ukraine youth international footballers
Ukraine under-21 international footballers
Ukrainian expatriate footballers
Ukrainian expatriate sportspeople in Spain
Expatriate footballers in Spain
Ukrainian expatriate sportspeople in Poland
Expatriate footballers in Poland